Shish taouk or shish tawook is a traditional marinated chicken shish kebab of Ottoman cuisine that later became part of Middle Eastern cuisine. It is widely eaten in the Middle East and Caucasus. A similar dish in Persian cuisine is the traditional jujeh kabab. It is also served in kebab houses in many cities around the world.

Etymology
Shish in Syrian-Arabic dialects or şiş in Turkish means skewer. Some scholars assert that it is itself a Persian loanword from sikh, others say that it comes from the root "sı" in old Turkish meaning "to cut". It has been adopted in Egyptian Arabic, Lebanese-Arabic and Syrian-Arabic dialects. Tavuk comes from old Turkic takagu and means chicken.

Preparation
The dish consists of cubes of chicken that are marinated, then skewered and grilled. Common marinades are based upon yogurt and lemon juice or tomato puree, though there are other variations.

Methods of serving
The dish is eaten either as a sandwich or on a platter with vegetables, sometimes with rice or French fries. The Turkish cuisine version is generally served with rice, yogurt, cucumber salad and skewer-grilled vegetables. The Syrian and Lebanese version is usually served with toum (a garlic paste sauce), hummus and tabbouleh. The sandwich version comes generally in a flatbread or as a dürüm, and frequently accompanied by lettuce, tomatoes, and pickled turnips.
In Israeli cuisine it is served with a sumac-flavored tahini, fried onions, flatbread/pita and grilled hot chili peppers along with tabbouleh or Israeli salad and pickles (olives, carrots, bell peppers, cabbage and turnip).

See also

 List of Middle Eastern dishes
 List of chicken dishes
 List of kebabs
 Falafel
 Kafta

References

External links

Arab cuisine
Middle Eastern grilled meats
Lebanese cuisine
Egyptian cuisine
Iraqi cuisine
Israeli cuisine
Levantine cuisine
Palestinian cuisine
Chicken dishes
Skewered kebabs
Jordanian cuisine
Syrian cuisine
Turkish words and phrases
Turkish cuisine
Middle Eastern cuisine